Eleny-Nicoleta Ionel is a Romanian mathematician whose research concerns symplectic geometry, including the study of the Gromov–Witten invariants and Gopakumar–Vafa invariant.  Among her most significant results are the construction of relative Gromov-Witten invariants of symplectic manifolds, and the proof of the vanishing in codimension at least g of the tautological ring of the moduli space of genus-g curves.

She is a professor of mathematics at Stanford University, where she is chair of the mathematics department.

Education and career
Ionel is from Iași. She is the daughter of Adrian Ionel, a professor at the Ion Ionescu de la Brad University of Agricultural Sciences and Veterinary Medicine of Iași. She attended the Costache Negruzzi National College, graduating in 1987. She earned a bachelor's degree from Alexandru Ioan Cuza University in 1991, and completed her Ph.D. in 1996 from Michigan State University.

After postdoctoral research at the Mathematical Sciences Research Institute in Berkeley, California and a position as C. L. E. Moore instructor at the Massachusetts Institute of Technology, she joined the University of Wisconsin–Madison faculty in 1998, and moved to Stanford in 2004.

Recognition
Ionel is a Sloan Research Fellow and a Simons Fellow. She was an invited speaker at the International Congress of Mathematicians in 2002.  She was selected as a Fellow of the American Mathematical Society in the 2020 Class, for "contributions to symplectic geometry and the geometric analysis approach to Gromov–Witten Theory".

Selected publications

References

Year of birth missing (living people)
Living people
20th-century American mathematicians
21st-century American mathematicians
20th-century Romanian mathematicians
American women mathematicians
Alexandru Ioan Cuza University alumni
Massachusetts Institute of Technology School of Science faculty
University of Wisconsin–Madison faculty
Stanford University faculty
Michigan State University alumni
20th-century women mathematicians
21st-century women mathematicians
21st-century Romanian mathematicians
Sloan Research Fellows
Fellows of the American Mathematical Society
Scientists from Iași
Costache Negruzzi National College alumni
Romanian emigrants to the United States
20th-century American women
21st-century American women